Souvenir is the fourth studio album by the American punk band Banner Pilot. Souvenir was recorded in October–December 2013 and released on April 15, 2014 by Fat Wreck Chords on LP and CD. It is the third studio album by Banner Pilot on this label.

Track listing 
 "Modern Shakes" – 2:29
 "Effigy" – 2:57
 "Dead Tracks" – 3:22
 "Heat Rash" – 2:47
 "Fireproof" – 2:40
 "Letterbox" – 4:03
 "Shoreline" – 3:20
 "Hold Fast" – 2:42
 "Colfax" – 3:09
 "Springless" – 3:01
 "Matchstick" – 3:06
 "Summer Ash" – 5:22

Performers 
 Corey Ayd - guitar
 Nate Gangelhoff - guitar, bass
 Nick Johnson - vocals
 Dan Elston-Jones - drums, piano

References 

2014 albums
Fat Wreck Chords albums
Banner Pilot albums